Der Blaue Reiter (The Blue Rider) is a designation by Wassily Kandinsky and Franz Marc for their exhibition and publication activities, in which both artists acted as sole editors in the almanac of the same name, first published in mid-May 1912. The editorial team organized two exhibitions in Munich in 1911 and 1912 to demonstrate their art-theoretical ideas based on the works of art exhibited. Traveling exhibitions in German and other European cities followed. The Blue Rider disbanded at the start of World War I in 1914.

The artists associated with Der Blaue Reiter were important pioneers of modern art of the 20th century; they formed a loose network of relationships, but not an art group in the narrower sense like Die Brücke (The Bridge) in Dresden. The work of the affiliated artists is assigned to German Expressionism.

History

The forerunner of The Blue Rider was the Neue Künstlervereinigung München (N.K.V.M; New Artists' Association Munich), instigated by Marianne von Werefkin, Alexej von Jawlensky, Adolf Erbslöh and the German entrepreneur, art collector, aviation pioneer and musician . The N.K.V.M was co-founded in 1909, and Kandinsky, as its first chairman, organized the exhibitions of 1909 and 1910. Even before the first exhibition, Kandinsky introduced the so-called "four square meter clause" into the statutes of the N.K.V.M due to a difference of opinion with the painter Charles Johann Palmié, this clause would give Kandinsky the lever to leave the N.K.V.M in 1911. In 1911, Palmié allowed Kandinsky and Marc to leave the association and organize the first Blue Rider exhibition. The Blue Rider was thus a spin-off (Secession) from the N.K.V.M.

When there were repeated disputes among the conservative forces in the N.K.V.M, which flared up due to Kandinsky's increasingly abstract painting, he resigned the chairmanship on 10 January 1911 but remained in the association as a simple member. His successor was Adolf Erbslöh. In June, Kandinsky developed plans for his activities outside of the N.K.V.M. He intended to publish a "kind of almanac" which could be called Die Kette (The Chain). On 19 June, he pitched his idea to Marc and won him over by offering him the co-editing of the book.

The name of the movement is the title of a painting that Kandinsky created in 1903, but it is unclear whether it is the origin of the name of the movement, as Professor Klaus Lankheit learned that the title of the painting had been overwritten. Kandinsky wrote 20 years later that the name is derived from Marc's enthusiasm for horses and Kandinsky's love of riders, combined with a shared love of the color blue. For Kandinsky, blue was the color of spirituality: the darker the blue, the more it awakened human desire for the eternal (see his 1911 book On the Spiritual in Art).

Within the group, artistic approaches and aims varied from artist to artist; however, the artists shared a common desire to express spiritual truths through their art. They believed in the promotion of modern art; the connection between visual art and music; the spiritual and symbolic associations of color; and a spontaneous, intuitive approach to painting. Members were interested in European medieval art and primitivism, as well as the contemporary, non-figurative art scene in France. As a result of their encounters with Cubist, Fauvist and Rayonist ideas, they moved towards abstraction.

Der Blaue Reiter organized exhibitions in 1911 and 1912 that toured Germany. They also published an almanac featuring contemporary, primitive and folk art, along with children's paintings. In 1913 they exhibited in the first German Herbstsalon.

The group was disrupted by the outbreak of the First World War in 1914. Franz Marc and August Macke were killed in combat. Wassily Kandinsky returned to Russia, and Marianne von Werefkin and Alexej von Jawlensky fled to Switzerland. There were also differences in opinion within the group. As a result, Der Blaue Reiter was short-lived, lasting for only three years from 1911 to 1914.

Supported by their dealer Galka Scheyer, Kandinsky, Feininger, Klee and Alexej von Jawlensky formed Die Blaue Vier (The Blue Four) group in 1923. Together they exhibited and lectured in the United States from 1924.

An extensive collection of paintings by Der Blaue Reiter is exhibited in the Städtische Galerie in the Lenbachhaus in Munich.

Almanac 
Conceived in June 1911, Der Blaue Reiter Almanach (The Blue Rider Almanac) was published in early 1912, by Piper, Munich, in an edition of 1100 copies; on 11 May, Franz Marc received the first print. The volume was edited by Kandinsky and Marc; its costs were underwritten by the industrialist and art collector Bernhard Koehler, a relative of Macke. It contained reproductions of more than 140 artworks, and 14 major articles. A second volume was planned, but the start of World War I prevented it. Instead, a second edition of the original was printed in 1914, again by Piper.

The contents of the Almanac included:

 Marc's essay "Spiritual Treasures," illustrated with children's drawings, German woodcuts, Chinese paintings, and Pablo Picasso's Woman with Mandolin at the Piano
 an article by French critic Roger Allard on Cubism
 Arnold Schoenberg's article "The Relationship to the Text", and a facsimile of his song "Herzgewächse"
 facsimiles of song settings by Alban Berg and Anton Webern
 Thomas de Hartmann's essay "Anarchy in Music"
 an article about Alexander Scriabin's Prometheus: The Poem of Fire
 an article by Erwin von Busse on Robert Delaunay, illustrated with a print of his The Window on the City
 Macke's essay "Masks"
 Kandinsky's essay "On the Question of Form"
 Kandinsky's "On Stage Composition"
 Kandinsky's The Yellow Sound.

The art reproduced in the Almanac marked a dramatic turn away from a Eurocentric and conventional orientation. The selection was dominated by primitive, folk, and children's art, with pieces from the South Pacific and Africa, Japanese drawings, medieval German woodcuts and sculpture, Egyptian puppets, Russian folk art, and Bavarian religious art painted on glass. The five works by Van Gogh, Cézanne, and Gauguin were outnumbered by seven from Henri Rousseau and thirteen from child artists.

Exhibitions

First exhibition
December 18, 1911, the "First exhibition of the editorial board of Der Blaue Reiter" (Erste Ausstellung der Redaktion Der Blaue Reiter) opened at the Heinrich Thannhauser's Moderne Galerie in Munich, running through the first days of 1912. 43 works by 14 artists were shown: paintings by Henri Rousseau, Albert Bloch, David Burliuk, Wladimir Burliuk, Heinrich Campendonk, Robert Delaunay, Elisabeth Epstein, Eugen von Kahler, Wassily Kandinsky, August Macke, Franz Marc, Gabriele Münter, Jean Bloé Niestlé and Arnold Schönberg, and an illustrated catalogue edited.

From January 1912 through July 1914, the exhibition toured Europe with venues in Cologne, Berlin, Bremen, Hagen, Frankfurt, Hamburg, Budapest, Oslo, Helsinki, Trondheim and Göteborg.

Second exhibition
February 12 through April 2, 1912, the "Second exhibition of the editorial board of Der Blaue Reiter" showed works in "Black & White" (Zweite Ausstellung der Redaktion Der Blaue Reiter, Schwarz-Weiß) at the "New Art" Gallery of Hans Goltz (Neue Kunst Hans Goltz) in Munich.

Other shows
The artists of Der Blaue Reiter also participated in:
 1912 Cologne, Sonderbund westdeutscher Kunstfreunde und Künstler
 1913 Berlin, Erster Deutscher Herbstsalon organised by Herwarth Walden and his gallery Der Sturm

Members

Albert Bloch
David Burliuk
Heinrich Campendonk
Clotilde von Derp
Lyonel Feininger
Natalia Goncharova
Alexej von Jawlensky
Wassily Kandinsky
Paul Klee
Alfred Kubin
August Macke
Franz Marc
Gabriele Münter
Arnold Schoenberg
Marianne von Werefkin

Notes

References
John E. Bowlt, Rose-Carol Washton Long. The Life of Vasilii Kandinsky in Russian art: a study of "On the spiritual in art" by Wassily Kandinsky. Pub l. Newtonville, Mass. USA. 1980.   
Wassily Kandinsky, M. T. Sadler (Translator) Concerning the Spiritual in Art. Dover Publ. (Paperback). 80 pp. . or: Lightning Source Inc. Publ. (Paperback). 
 
 Hoberg, Annegret, & Friedel, Helmut (ed.): Der Blaue Reiter und das Neue Bild, 1909-1912, Prestel, München, London & New York 1999  
 Hopfengart, Christine: Der Blaue Reiter, DuMont, Cologne 2000

External links

 
Collection: "Expressionism–Der Blaue Reiter" from the University of Michigan Museum of Art

German artist groups and collectives
German art movements
History of Munich
Culture in Munich
1911 establishments in Germany
1914 disestablishments in Germany
Wassily Kandinsky